Aru Tateno (born August 29, 1997) is a retired Japanese ice dancer. With his former skating partner, Rikako Fukase, he has competed in the final segment at three ISU Championships. The duo placed 19th at the 2016 World Junior Championships in Debrecen, Hungary; 13th at the 2017 World Junior Championships in Taipei, Taiwan; and 11th at the 2018 Four Continents Championships in Taipei.

Programs 
(with Hirayama)

(with Fukase)

Competitive highlights 
CS: Challenger Series; JGP: Junior Grand Prix

With Hirayama

With Fukase

With Maeda

References

External links 
 
 

1997 births
Japanese male ice dancers
Living people
Sportspeople from Yokohama